Jonah's Ark is the third studio album by British folk metal band Skyclad.

Track listing

"Thinking Allowed?" (Music: Steve Ramsey, Dave Pugh/ Lyrics: Martin Walkyier) - 3:54
"Cry of the Land" (Music: Steve Ramsey/ Lyrics: Martin Walkyier) - 4:24
"Schadenfreude" (Music: Steve Ramsey/ Lyrics: Martin Walkyier) - 4:05
"A Near Life Experience" (Music: Steve Ramsey, Dave Pugh/ Lyrics: Martin Walkyier) - 3:16
"The Wickedest Man in the World" (Music: Graeme English/ Lyrics: Martin Walkyier) - 3:57
"Earth Mother, the Sun and the Furious Host" (Music: Steve Ramsey/ Lyrics: Martin Walkyier) - 3:16
"The Ilk of Human Blindness" (Music: Steve Ramsey/ Lyrics: Martin Walkyier) - 3:45
"Tunnel Visionaries" (Music: Dave Pugh/ Lyrics: Martin Walkyier) - 0:58
"A Word to the Wise" (Music: Steve Ramsey/ Lyrics: Martin Walkyier) - 6:13
"Bewilderbeast" (Music: Graeme English/ Lyrics: Martin Walkyier) - 2:37
"It Wasn't Meant to End This Way" (Music: Graeme English/ Lyrics: Martin Walkyier) - 3:21

References

Jonah's Ark at Encyclopaedia Metallum

1993 albums
Skyclad (band) albums
Noise Records albums
Albums produced by Kevin Ridley